World of Pub is a radio and television sitcom, set in a pub in the East End of London, written by Tony Roche, directed by Michael Cumming and produced by Jane Berthoud.

The radio version had two series on BBC Radio 4, between 4 March 1998 and 28 January 1999, both lasting four episodes. The series one episodes last 15 minutes, whereas series two had episodes lasting 30 minutes. The TV series ran for six episodes, lasting 30 minutes, between 24 June and 29 July 2001 on BBC Two.

Plot
Each episode was set in an unsuccessful pub in London's East End. At the end of each episode, a disaster, visit from royalty, angry mob etc. destroys the pub. The pub is run by brothers, the nervous Barry and the idiotic Garry. The only regulars of the pub are Bob and Dodgy Phil. Every episode revolves around one of Dodgy Phil's plans to improve the pub, a plan which Barry always has doubts about. The doubts are often confirmed due to the pub's destruction at the end of every episode. One of the running jokes in the series is that, as the pub is next to a zoo, unusual animals are often found inside it.
The plot often follows the same formula; The pub is destroyed or needs rebuilding, and Dodgy Phil produces a scheme to re-launch the pub, which Barry disputes. Dodgy Phil telephones a friend, such as 'Mock Tudor Mick' or 'Logistical Nightmare Len', who arrives immediately to rebuild the pub, together with a set of characters represented by sound effects, and often Edith Piaf. The work is then finished in a short sound effect (often to the sound of Je ne regrette rien). The plan is flawed, and the pub is destroyed or closed down at the end of each episode.

Cast
The only member of the cast to appear in all of the episodes is Phil Cornwell, who plays Barry.

Garry is played by Peter Serafinowicz in the first radio series, but by Alistair McGowan in series two. Serafinowicz returned as Garry in the television series.

Dodgy Phil is played by John Thomson in the radio series, but by Kevin Eldon in the TV series.

Guest appearances
The television version had some noticeable guest appearances. In the episodes Queen, cockney singers Chas and Dave make an appearance.

In the episode Ladies, feminist Germaine Greer makes an appearance, where she sings "Stand by Your Man".

Episodes

Radio

Television

See also
 List of public house topics

External links
World of Pub at Internet Movie Database
World of Pub homepage on the BBC
TV Episode Guide
Radio Episode Guide
World of Pub at the British Sitcom Guide

BBC Radio 4 programmes
BBC Radio comedy programmes
1998 radio programme debuts
BBC television sitcoms
2001 British television series debuts
2001 British television series endings
Television shows set in London
2000s British sitcoms